Greg Harnett (born June 30, 1990 in Toronto, Ontario) is a professional indoor lacrosse defenceman who plays for the Buffalo Bandits in the National Lacrosse League. He previously played for the Calgary Roughnecks, wearing #50. He was drafted in the 2nd round (11th overall) in the 2011 NLL Entry Draft.  After playing 9 years with the Roughneck, Harnett signed a 1-year contract with the Bandits prior to the 2023 season.

Harnett's brother, Jon, is also a lacrosse player.

References

1990 births
Living people
Calgary Roughnecks players
Canadian lacrosse players
Lacrosse defenders
Lacrosse people from Ontario
Sportspeople from Toronto